This is a list of nationwide public opinion polls that have been conducted relating to the general election for the 2020 Taiwanese general election. The persons named in the polls are declared candidates or have received media speculation about their possible candidacy.

Presidential election
Rating figures are in percentages.

Graphical summary

Polls with candidates
Han–Soong–Tsai

Han–Tsai

Polls with previous potential candidates 
Ko–Han–Tsai

Gou–Tsai

Chu–Tsai

Wang–Tsai

Ma–Tsai

Chang–Tsai

Wu–Tsai

Ko–Chu–Tsai

Ko–Wang–Tsai

Ko–Gou–Tsai

Tsai–Gou–Chu

Ko–Wu–Tsai

Ko–Wu–Lai

Chu–Lai

Wang–Lai

Han–Lai

Ma–Lai

Chang–Lai

Gou–Lai

Wu–Lai

Ko–Chu–Lai

Ko–Wang–Lai

Ko–Han–Lai

Ko–Gou–Lai

Ko–Wu–Lai

Legislative election

Party vote

Coalition vote

Constituency vote

Taipei 4

Hsinchu City

Notelist

References

2020 elections in Taiwan
Opinion polling in Taiwan